Hillsborough Interchange is a bus and tram interchange in Hillsborough, Sheffield. It serves a variety of operators including First South Yorkshire,Sheffield Supertram and Stagecoach Yorkshire, South Pennine Community Transport. It is staffed between 07:00 and 19:00 Monday to Saturday and has six bus stands and two tram platforms.

History

The area currently occupied by the bus station was formerly a Total Garage. Services that formerly terminated at Malin Bridge and Forbes Road were diverted into the Interchange, and services that formerly stopped further up the road by Hillsborough Barracks near the old Officer Mess building (now the headquarters for Sheffield Insulations Ltd) were also re-routed to stop at the Interchange.

Layout
Hillsborough Interchange is located near the Hillsborough Barracks.

The tram stop is located to the north of the interchange, and comprises two platforms. The platform which serves trams heading towards Malin Bridge and Middlewood is located in front of The Rawson Spring public house, with the platform serving trams towards Halfway and Meadowhall Interchange being located opposite.

The bus station is located adjacent to the travel centre. Stand H1 is adjacent to, but set back from, Langsett Road, with stands H2 and H3 line with this. Stands H4 and H5 have the same continuous shelter and run at 45 degrees from the travel centre to the cycle parking at rear of the bus station. Stand H6 is located opposite stands H4 and H5. A further two bus stops are located next to the Interchange directly on Langsett Road.

Services
, the stand allocation is:

Sheffield Supertram operate two routes through Hillsborough Interchange. The Blue route continues north to Malin Bridge and south to Halfway via the city centre, whilst the Yellow route runs between Middlewood in the west and Meadowhall Interchange in the east, again via the city centre. Both services run every 12 minutes from Monday to Saturday, with additional peak services running in the morning and evening peaks, and every 20 minutes on evenings and Sundays.

References

Bus stations in South Yorkshire
Bus transport in Sheffield
Sheffield Supertram stops